Mung may refer to:

 Mung (computer term), the act of making several incremental changes to an item that combine to destroy it
 Mung bean, a bean native to Bangladesh, India, and Pakistan
 Rafael Cabrera Airport (ICAO code MUNG)
 A fouling material (a disgusting substance)
 The common name of the brown algae Pylaiella
 A transliteration of the Korean word 멍멍, an onomatopoeia for bark (dog)
 MUNG, acronym of Military University Nueva Granada
 Mung Chiang, computer scientist and academic
 Le Mung, commune in southwestern France 
 Mung, a dialect or related language of the Phunoi language of Laos
 Malevolent spirits in Mun (religion) of the Lepcha people of Sikkim

In fiction:
 Mung, Lord of all Deaths, a god in Lord Dunsany's short story collection The Gods of Pegāna
 Mung Daal, a character in the cartoon series Chowder
 Mung the Inconceivable, a member of the Warbound, appearing in Hulk comics
 Mung, Lord Dregg's second-in-command in the cartoon series Teenage Mutant Ninja Turtles

See also
 Hmong people